Safia is a town in the Ouo Department of Comoé Province in south-western Burkina Faso. The town has a population of 1,050.

References

Safia is also a feminine name meaning wise. Variations include Sophia, Sofia, Saphia, and Sofie

Populated places in the Cascades Region
Comoé Province